Asterodon is a genus of two species of crust fungi in the family Hymenochaetaceae. Several species once placed in this genus were transferred to Pseudasterodon.

Species list
Asterodon albus Rick 1959
Asterodon ferruginosus Pat. 189

References

Hymenochaetaceae
Agaricomycetes genera